William Olaf Stapledon (10 May 1886 – 6 September 1950) – known as Olaf Stapledon – was a British philosopher and author of  science fiction. In 2014, he was inducted into the Science Fiction and Fantasy Hall of Fame.

Life
Stapledon was born in Seacombe, Wallasey, on the Wirral Peninsula in Cheshire, the only son of William Clibbett Stapledon and Emmeline Miller. The first six years of his life were spent with his parents at Port Said, Egypt. He was educated at Abbotsholme School and Balliol College, Oxford, where he acquired a BA degree in Modern History (Second Class) in 1909, promoted to an MA degree in 1913. After a brief stint as a teacher at Manchester Grammar School he worked in shipping offices in Liverpool and Port Said from 1910 to 1912. From 1912 to 1915 Stapledon worked with the Liverpool branch of the Workers' Educational Association.

During the First World War he served as a conscientious objector. Stapledon became an ambulance driver with the Friends' Ambulance Unit in France and Belgium from July 1915 to January 1919; he was awarded the Croix de Guerre for bravery.<ref name="vg">Vincent Geoghegan,"Olaf Stapledon:Religious but not a Christian" in Socialism and religion : roads to common wealth.London: Routledge, 2011.  (pp. 85–108).</ref> His wartime experiences influenced his pacifist beliefs and advocacy of a World Government.   On 16 July 1919 he married Agnes Zena Miller (1894–1984), an Australian cousin. They had first met in 1903, and later maintained a correspondence throughout the war. They had a daughter, Mary Sydney Stapledon (1920–2008), and a son, John David Stapledon (1923–2014). In 1920 they moved to West Kirby.

Stapledon was awarded a PhD degree in philosophy from the University of Liverpool in 1925 and used his doctoral thesis as the basis for his first published prose book, A Modern Theory of Ethics (1929). However, he soon turned to fiction in the hope of presenting his ideas to a wider public. The relative success of Last and First Men (1930) prompted him to become a full-time writer. He wrote a sequel, Last Men in London, and followed it up with many more books of both fiction and philosophy.

For the duration of the Second World War Stapledon abandoned his pacifism and supported the war effort. In 1940 the Stapledon family built and moved into a new house on Simon's Field, in Caldy, in Wirral. During the war Stapledon became a public advocate of J.B. Priestley and Richard Acland's left-wing Common Wealth Party, as well as the British internationalist group Federal Union.

After 1945 Stapledon travelled widely on lecture tours, visiting the Netherlands, Sweden and France, and in 1948 he spoke at the World Congress of Intellectuals for Peace in Wrocław, Poland. He attended the Conference for World Peace held in New York City in 1949, the only Briton to be granted a visa to do so. In 1950 he became involved with the anti-apartheid movement. After a week of lectures in Paris, he cancelled a projected trip to Yugoslavia and returned to his home in Caldy, where he died very suddenly of a heart attack.

Stapledon was cremated at Landican Crematorium. His widow and their children scattered his ashes on the sandy cliffs overlooking the Dee Estuary, a favourite spot of his that features in more than one of his books. Stapledon Wood, on the south-east side of Caldy Hill, is named after him.

Works
Stapledon's fiction often presents the strivings of some intelligence that is beaten down by an indifferent universe and its inhabitants who, through no fault of their own, fail to comprehend its lofty yearnings. It is filled with protagonists who are tormented by the conflict between their "higher" and "lower" impulses.

Stapledon's writings directly influenced Arthur C. Clarke, Brian Aldiss, Stanisław Lem, Bertrand Russell, John Gloag, Naomi Mitchison, C. S. Lewis, Vernor Vinge, John Maynard Smith and indirectly influenced many others, contributing many ideas to the world of science fiction. The "supermind" composed of many individual consciousnesses forms a recurring theme in his work. Star Maker contains the first known description of what are now called Dyson spheres. Freeman Dyson credits the novel with giving him the idea, even stating in an interview that "Stapledon sphere" would be a more appropriate name. Last and First Men features early descriptions of genetic engineering and terraforming. Sirius describes a dog whose intelligence is increased to the level of a human being's.

Some commentators have called Stapledon a Marxist, although Stapledon distanced himself from the label. Stapledon's work also refers to then-contemporary intellectual fashions (e.g. the belief in extrasensory perception).Last and First Men, a "future history" of 18 successive species of humanity, and Star Maker, an outline history of the Universe, were highly acclaimed by figures as diverse as Jorge Luis Borges, J. B. Priestley, Bertrand Russell, Algernon Blackwood, Hugh Walpole, Arnold Bennett, Virginia Woolf (Stapledon maintained a correspondence with Woolf) and Winston Churchill. In contrast, Stapledon's philosophy repelled C. S. Lewis, whose Cosmic Trilogy was written partly in response to what Lewis saw as amorality, although Lewis admired Stapledon's inventiveness and described him as "a corking good writer". In fact Stapledon was an agnostic who was hostile to religious institutions, but not to religious yearnings, a fact that set him at odds with H. G. Wells in their correspondence.

Together with his philosophy lectureship at the University of Liverpool, which now houses the Olaf Stapledon archive, Stapledon lectured in English literature, industrial history and psychology. He wrote many non-fiction books on political and ethical subjects, in which he advocated the growth of "spiritual values", which he defined as those values expressive of a yearning for greater awareness of the self in a larger context ("personality-in-community"). Stapledon himself named his spiritual values as intelligence, love and creative action. His philosophy was strongly influenced by Spinoza.

Stapledon is considered one of forerunners of the contemporary transhumanist movement.

Film rights
Film producer and director George Pal bought the rights to Odd John and in 1966 Castle of Frankenstein magazine reported that David McCallum would play the title role.

In 2017 a multimedia work adaption of Last and First Men by Oscar-nominated Icelandic composer Jóhann Jóhannsson was released, featuring narration from Tilda Swinton and a live score performed by the BBC Philharmonic.

In 2019 a short film adaption of Stapledon's story "A Modern Magician" was written by, produced by and starred Justin McDonald and Kate Hodgson. The film, which was directed by Mark Heller, also featured the voice of Brian Cox and marked the first ever live action adaptation of any of Stapledon's literary works.

Bibliography

FictionLast and First Men: A Story of the Near and Far Future (1930)Last Men in London (1932)Odd John: A Story Between Jest and Earnest (1935)Star Maker (1937) First Edition cover by Bip Pares Darkness and the Light (1942)Old Man in New World (short story, 1944)Sirius: A Fantasy of Love and Discord (1944)Death into Life (1946)The Flames: A Fantasy (1947)A Man Divided (1950)Four Encounters (1976)Nebula Maker (drafts of Star Maker, 1976)
 East is West (posthumous, 1979)

Non-fictionA Modern Theory of Ethics: A study of the Relations of Ethics and Psychology (1929)Waking World (1934)Saints and Revolutionaries (1939)New Hope for Britain (1939)Philosophy and Living, 2 volumes (1939)Beyond the "Isms" (1942)Seven Pillars of Peace (1944)Youth and Tomorrow (1946)Interplanetary Man? (1948)The Opening of the Eyes (ed. Agnes Z. Stapledon, 1954)

PoetryLatter-Day Psalms (1914)

CollectionsWorlds of Wonder: Three Tales of Fantasy (1949)To the End of Time: the Best of Olaf Stapledon (ed. Basil Davenport, 1953)Far Future Calling: Uncollected Science Fiction and Fantasies of Olaf Stapledon (ed. Sam Moskowitz 1979 )An Olaf Stapledon Reader'' (ed. Robert Crossley, 1997)

See also

List of peace activists
List of ambulance drivers during World War I

References

External links

 
 Olaf Stapledon Archive at the University of Liverpool SF Hub
 Works at Project Gutenberg Australia
 
 Olaf Stapledon at the Science Fiction and Fantasy Hall of Fame
  (including 1 "from old catalog" as William Olaf)
Digitized works by Olaf Stapledon at Toronto Public Library

1886 births
1950 deaths
20th-century British short story writers
20th-century English novelists
20th-century English philosophers
20th-century English poets
Academics of the University of Liverpool
Alumni of Balliol College, Oxford
Alumni of the University of Liverpool
British ethicists
English agnostics
English anti-war activists
English conscientious objectors
English male novelists
English male poets
English male short story writers
English short story writers
English pacifists
English science fiction writers
English socialists
Lost Generation writers
People associated with the Friends' Ambulance Unit
People educated at Abbotsholme School
People from Wallasey
Philosophers of history
Philosophers of mind
Philosophers of science
Philosophers of technology
Philosophical cosmologists
Philosophy writers
Science Fiction Hall of Fame inductees
British transhumanists
20th-century English male writers